St Vincent's Hurling and Football Club is a Gaelic Athletic Association club based in the Blarney Street and  Sundays Well parts of Cork city, Ireland. It also includes in its catchment area Gurranabraher, Churchfield and Knocknaheeny. Teams are fielded in Gaelic football, hurling and camogie. The club participates in Cork GAA competitions and in Seandún board competitions. The greatest achievements in the club's history was winning the 1968 Cork Intermediate Hurling Championship and the 2006 & 2012 Premier Intermediate Football Championship. As a result, they were promoted to senior status after both Premier Intermediate Football Championship wins but were not able to maintain senior status. The club now plays in the Premier Intermediate Football Championship and Junior A Hurling Championship.

History
In 1943 St Vincent's Hurling and Football Club was founded to promote Gaelic games in the Blarney Street and Sundays Well areas on the North West side of Cork City. Later, as the city grew, their catchment area expanded to encompass Gurranabraher, Churchfield and Knocknaheeny. From small beginnings few could have imagined that Cumman Uinsinn Naofa would develop so quickly to become such a thriving and successful club in such a short period of time.

By 1946 the club had won the Junior Football County Final and boasted to being one of the first clubs in the county to own their own pitch. The grounds would be redeveloped on a couple of occasions over the decades culminating in the activities from the early nineties which have seen the building of a state of the art complex housing several dressing rooms, meeting rooms, a large training hall, 3 adult size pitches and a social club in Blarney Rd. An all-weather pitch has recently been installed and there are plans to install floodlighting on one of the adult pitches.

On the playing side, the club has won numerous honours over the years at all levels including the intermediate hurling county title in 1968 and a senior hurling league in 1972. Recent years has heralded great success at underage level with various teams winning honours at the premier and A grades. The highlight of this has been the winning of the Minor Premier County in 1998. These players would go on to join with members of other successful underage teams from the 90’s to help the club win its first intermediate football title in 2006, and a second one came in quick succession in 2012. The club celebrated its 75th anniversary in 2018. The club this year is marking the centenary of the 'Ballycannon Boy's' six young Irish Volunteers killed by British Crown Forces at Kerry Pike near Clogheen Co. Cork as well as the centenary of Alderman Tadhg Barry shot and killed by a British Army sentry while interned at Ballykinlar Camp in Co. Down, St. Vincent's in years gone by had juvenile teams named after Irish patriots.

Achievements
 Cork Senior Football Championship Runners-Up 1948
 Cork Intermediate Hurling Championship Winners (1) 1968  Runners-Up 1959, 1960
 Cork Premier Intermediate Football Championship Winners (2) 2006, 2012    Runners-Up 2008
 Munster Intermedite Club Football Championship Runners-Up 2012
 Cork Junior Football Championship Winners (1) 1946
 Cork Premier Minor Football Championship Winners (1) 1998
 Cork Minor Hurling Championship Winners (1) 1957
 Cork Minor B Football Championship Winners (1) 1990  Runners-Up 1991
 Cork Minor B Hurling Championship Winners (1) 1986
 Cork City Junior Hurling Championship Winners (3) 1951, 1954, 1957  Runners-Up 1953, Runners-up 2021
 Cork City Junior Football Championship Winners (3) 1946, 1950, 1966  Runners-Up 1945, 1962, 1977, 1978, 1987,
 Cork City Junior C Football Championship Winners (1) 2021

Notable Club Members
 Paddy Barry - hurling goalkeeper with Cork. 1970 All-Ireland Senior Hurling Championship winning captain. 
 Miah Dennehy – a Republic of Ireland  international footballer 
 Paddy O'Shea - reserve goalkeeper on Cork football panel that won the All Ireland in 2010 and holder of Div 1 and 2 National League medals and 3 Munster Championship medals.
 Seán Óg Murphy

References

Additional sources

External links
 St Vincent's website
 Cork GAA finals
 Cork GAA results

Gaelic games clubs in County Cork
Hurling clubs in County Cork
Gaelic football clubs in County Cork